Spencer Township may refer to:

Indiana
 Spencer Township, DeKalb County, Indiana
 Spencer Township, Harrison County, Indiana
 Spencer Township, Jennings County, Indiana

Michigan
 Spencer Township, Michigan

Minnesota
 Spencer Township, Aitkin County, Minnesota

Missouri
 Spencer Township, Douglas County, Missouri, in Douglas County, Missouri
 Spencer Township, Pike County, Missouri
 Spencer Township, Ralls County, Missouri

Nebraska
 Spencer Township, Boyd County, Nebraska

North Dakota
 Spencer Township, Ward County, North Dakota, in Ward County, North Dakota

Ohio
 Spencer Township, Allen County, Ohio
 Spencer Township, Guernsey County, Ohio
 Spencer Township, Hamilton County, Ohio (defunct)
 Spencer Township, Lucas County, Ohio
 Spencer Township, Medina County, Ohio

See also
Spencer (disambiguation)

Township name disambiguation pages